Avon Station is a former railroad station 3943 for the Erie Railroad, located at 100 West Main Street, Avon, Livingston County, New York.

History 
Railroad service in the village of Avon began on July 25, 1853, with the extension of the Buffalo, Corning and New York Railroad (a division of what was eventually known as the New York, Lake Erie & Western Railroad) from Wayland to Caledonia. 

The current station depot was built in 1879 for the New York, Lake Erie & Western Railroad (later known as the Erie Railroad). Basic on photographs, the station building also has timbering and wooden support brackets, as well as ornamental cutwork above its entrance.

On June 18, 1907, the Avon Station was one of the few stops on the Erie Railroad to be electrified when service to Rochester became an electric service. The electric service ended on December 1, 1934, when the Erie switched to gas motorcars for passenger service to reduce costs.

One of the more active hubs of the Erie Railroad, Avon Station served as the terminus of four different Erie lines: the Rochester Division (Painted Post–Avon), the Rochester Branch (Rochester–Avon), the Mount Morris Branch (Mount Morris–Avon), and the Attica Branch (Avon–Attica, where connections were made to the Buffalo Division).

Closing 
Passenger service in Avon began to discontinue before and after electric service ended. Service between Attica and Avon ended on April 30, 1933. The branch to Mount Morris followed on January 20, 1940. Service to Rochester ended on September 30, 1941. The Rochester Division passenger service ended on September 28, 1947.

References

Former Erie Railroad stations
Railway stations in the United States opened in 1853
Railway stations closed in 1947
1853 establishments in New York (state)
Former railway stations in New York (state)